Salvation Jane may refer to:

 Salvation Jane (film), 1927 American silent film directed by Phil Rosen
 Salvation Jane (album), 1995 album by Jenny Morris
 Salvation Jane, a common name for the plant Echium plantagineum in Australia